Iris Floyd Kyle (born August 22, 1974) is an African-Indian American professional female bodybuilder. She is currently the most successful female professional bodybuilder ever with seventeen titles including ten overall Ms. Olympia wins (the most Mr. or Ms. Olympia wins of anyone) and seven overall Ms. International wins. In 2013, she was ranked as the best female bodybuilder in the IFBB Pro Women's Bodybuilding Ranking List.

Early life
Iris Floyd Kyle was born on August 22, 1974 in Benton Harbor, Michigan, the fifth of six children. Her early athletic endeavors included running cross country, basketball (point guard), softball (shortstop) and volleyball. She was an All-American in basketball, and received a number of athletic scholarship offers. Kyle attended Benton Harbor High School and continued her education at Alcorn State University in Lorman, Mississippi, on a basketball scholarship, majoring in business administration and minoring in accounting.

Bodybuilding career

Amateur
Iris claims the reason she got into bodybuilding was when she and her family moved to Orange County, California, and being surrounded by fit, healthy-looking people, she thought she could obtain a similar highly trained, sculpted physique. She walked into Bally Total Fitness and took out a membership. Eventually she got a job teaching aerobics and later a sales manager at Bally Total Fitness, which is when she started lifting weights. "I distinctly remember being a bit overwhelmed with the facilities and the seemingly endless variety of training equipment, but I knew at that exact moment ... without feeling even the slightest doubt ... that I could develop the kind of physique I wanted." She became a voracious reader of the magazines FLEX, Muscle and Fitness, and Iron Man.

Iris recalls, "I remember the first time I saw a photograph of Lenda Murray in a magazine. I was in complete awe. I cut out that picture and placed it on my refrigerator and, from that point on, my goal was to develop a physique like hers." One day, a local promoter named Butch Dennis was in her gym and, after sizing her up, suggested she enter a competition he was hosting in 8 weeks, the Long Beach Muscle Classic. Her model for her physique was a combination of Lenda Murray and Beverley Francis. She won the contest, the 1994 Long Beach Muscle Classic. From 1994 until turning pro, she was advised and coached by professional bodybuilder Patrick Lynn. After coming in 2nd in the middleweight category at the 1994 NPC Ironmaiden Championships, she began using performance-enhancing substances.

Steve Wennerstrom, IFBB women's historian, wrote a photoreport in the Women's Physique World November / December 1996 issue called "Keep An Eye on Iris Kyle!". In the report he focused on her 1996 NPC California overall and heavyweight title win. He also wrote that "The 5-7, 144-pound Kyle showed a dazzling level of muscle definition to go with sound structural balance and a stage savvy that puts her physical qualities at the national level right now."

In 1996, NPC USA Championships, Iris came in second to Heather Foster in the heavyweight category.

Professional

1999–2001
Iris began to distance herself from friends and family and to become very isolated, stating that she found this the best way to make gains. She has had a series of high placings as a professional. With the exception of the 1999 and 2008 Ms. Internationals, Iris has always placed in the top six in every IFBB pro bodybuilding competition in which she competed. Steve Wennerstrom, IFBB women's historian, wrote in the November 1999 edition of Flex that her 2nd place at the 1999 IFBB Pro World was "a welcome one for the structurally impressive 5'7", 155-pound Kyle." He also wrote that "Combining some of the qualities of Yolanda Hughes and Lenda Murray, with calves better than both, the 27-year-old health-club manager needs only to add some styling to her general appearance to put a shiny finish on her physical armament."

At the 2000 Ms International, Tazzie Colomb and Iris were both disqualified for diuretic use. She won her first professional contest at the 2001 Ms. Olympia, winning the heavyweight title, but losing the overall Olympia title to Juliette Bergmann. Looking back, Iris maintains, "I sincerely believe that I was the rightful 2001 Overall Ms. Olympia.  I'm not saying Juliette didn't display a nice overall package; I'm just saying I believe my physique was better."

2002–2005
In 2002, Lenda Murray returned from retirement to reclaim her Ms. Olympia title in 2002 and 2003, with Iris coming in second both times behind her idol. In 2004, Iris won both the overall and heavyweight titles of Ms. International and went on to beat Murray and win the overall and heavyweight title of the 2004 Ms. Olympia. In 2005, Iris skipped the Ms. International, and focused defending her Olympia title.  However, in 2005, the IFBB changed the rules and abolished the weight class system for Ms. Olympia, along with the new '20 percent rule' requesting "that female athletes in Bodybuilding, Fitness and Figure decrease the amount of muscularity by a factor of 20%". This allowed Yaxeni Oriquen-Garcia to win both the 2005 Ms. International and dethrone Iris at the 2005 Ms. Olympia.

2006–2014
In 2006, Iris rebounded by regaining both her Ms. International and Ms. Olympia titles. In 2007, she again won both Ms. International and Ms. Olympia. There was a bit of a controversy at the 2008 Ms. International. Iris was placed seventh due to noticeable site injections on her shoulders and glutes, which according to head IFBB judge, Sandy Ranalli, caused "distortions in her physique". After the 2008 Ms. International, on the Pro Bodybuilding Weekly Radio, when asked about why there was bumps on her shoulders and glutes, she said that "when you in the sport and you decide to take it to the league level you know those things take place". She also stated that the bumps won't even have been an issue if she had been a male and thought she should have been placed 1st.

Iris rebounded at the 2008 Ms. Olympia by winning the show. Iris went on to win both 2009 Ms. International and 2009 Ms. Olympia titles in the same year. At the 2010 Ms. International, Iris won her fifth Ms. International, surpassing Yaxeni Oriquen-Garcia's four Ms. International wins, becoming the most successful Ms. International champion ever. She has gone on to win the 2010 Ms. Olympia and 2011 Ms. International and 2011 Ms. Olympia. In 2012, she could not attend the 2012 Ms. International due to a leg injury. Iris went on to win the 2012 Ms. Olympia and regained her Ms. International title in 2013. In 2013, she won her ninth overall Ms. Olympia, making her the most successful female professional bodybuilder of all time. In 2014, she won her tenth overall Ms. Olympia title, breaking her own previous record of nine overall Ms. Olympia titles. After winning her tenth overall Ms. Olympia title, Iris stated that she was retiring from bodybuilding.

2015–2022
On September 25, 2015, in an interview with Dave Palumbo, Iris announced she will be coming out of retirement to compete at the 2016 Wings of Strength Rising Phoenix World Championships. Although she stated she wanted to compete at the 2016 Wings of Strength Rising Phoenix World Championships, the IFBB told her that she needed to either win the 2015 Puerto Rico Pro, 2015 Toronto Pro Supershow, the 2015 Omaha Pro, the 2016 Chicago Pro, the 2016 Lenda Murray Pro AM, and the 2016 PBW Tampa Pro, or be one the top 7 IFBB female bodybuilder's to accumulative points implementing the IFBB Tier 4 point system. Iris was angered at the IFBB, stating that she was entitled to compete for the fact she is the most successful bodybuilder, male or female, ever. Iris said that she was offered to do some work with them that she doesn't "agree with", but declined the offer. While the IFBB did later allow her a special invite to the 2016 Wings of Strength Rising Phoenix World Championships, she declined to compete, instead focusing on training her boyfriend, Hidetada Yamagishi, for the 2017 Arnold Classic Men's Physique and focusing on their business venture.

In September 2016, in an interview with Nevada Public Radio, Iris agreed with Jeff O'Connell's, editor of bodybuilding.com, assessment that performance-enhancing substances are quite prevalent in bodybuilding, especially at the Olympia level. However, she stressed that while IFBB professional female bodybuilders use performance-enhancing substances, it also requires hard work and genetics. When asked if she would rather compete without taking performance-enhancing substances if everyone else did, she responded that "I never said I took steroids, you said that." She also stated that IFBB professional female bodybuilding is infested with performance-enhancing substances. In the Winter 2016 edition of Muscle Sport Magazine, Kyle, in an interview with Joe Pietaro, criticized the IFBB for its treatment of female bodybuilders and called for the creation of a union and ambassador for female bodybuilders.

In July 2020, Iris announced she was compete at the 2020 Ms. Olympia. IFBB professional bodybuilder Patrick Tuor has been coaching her for the upcoming 2020 Ms. Olympia. She co-promotes two shows in Japan with her boyfriend, Hidetada Yamagishi. She ranks as the best female bodybuilder in the IFBB Pro Women's Bodybuilding Ranking List.

Number of titles
Iris has won seventeen overall IFBB professional titles and three IFBB professional heavyweight titles, which is more IFBB professional overall wins than any female bodybuilder. Of those wins she has ten overall Ms. Olympia titles, and has two professional heavyweight wins in her weight class.  Between 2000 and 2004, there were two weight classes, and from 2001 to 2004, there was an overall winner between the two class winners.  In 2001, she won the heavyweight class, but lost the overall Ms. Olympia title to the lightweight winner Juliette Bergmann. This discrepancy has led to confusion in various sport publications as to the number of Ms. Olympia titles she has won. She also has the most consecutive Olympia wins, with nine, dating 2006 to 2014.  She also has seven Ms. International overall wins with one heavyweight win, more than any female bodybuilder.

Competition history
1994 NPC Long Beach Muscle Classic – 1st
1994 NPC Ironmaiden Championships – 2nd (MW)
1996 NPC Orange County Muscle Classic – 1st (HW and Overall)
1996 NPC California – 1st (HW and Overall)
1996 NPC USA Championships – 2nd
1997 NPC USA Championships – 3rd (HW)
1997 NPC Nationals – 4th (HW)
1998 NPC USA Championships – 1st (HW and Overall)
1999 IFBB Ms. International – 15th
1999 IFBB Pro World Championship – 2nd
1999 IFBB Ms. Olympia – 4th
2000 IFBB Ms. International – 3rd (HW) (Later disqualified)
2000 IFBB Ms. Olympia – 5th (HW)
2001 IFBB Ms. International – 2nd (HW)
2001 IFBB Ms. Olympia – 1st (HW)
2002 IFBB Ms. International – 2nd (HW)
2002 IFBB Ms. Olympia – 2nd (HW)
2002 IFBB GNC Show of Strength – 2nd (HW)
2003 IFBB Ms. Olympia – 2nd (HW)
2004 IFBB Ms. International – 1st (HW and Overall)
2004 IFBB Ms. Olympia – 1st (HW and Overall)
2005 IFBB Ms. Olympia – 2nd
2006 IFBB Ms. International – 1st
2006 IFBB Ms. Olympia – 1st
2007 IFBB Ms. International – 1st
2007 IFBB Ms. Olympia – 1st
2008 IFBB Ms. International – 7th
2008 IFBB Ms. Olympia – 1st
2009 IFBB Ms. International – 1st
2009 IFBB Ms. Olympia – 1st
2010 IFBB Ms. International – 1st
2010 IFBB Ms. Olympia – 1st
2011 IFBB Ms. International – 1st
2011 IFBB Ms. Olympia – 1st
2012 IFBB Ms. Olympia – 1st
2013 IFBB Ms. International – 1st
2013 IFBB Ms. Olympia – 1st
2014 IFBB Ms. Olympia – 1st

Best statistics

 Bench press - 
 Biceps - 
 Calves - 
 Chest - 
 Height - 
 Hips - 
 On season weight:
  (1996 California)
  (1997 USA Championships)
  (1997 Nationals)
  (1999 Pro World Championship)
  (1999 Ms. Olympia)
  (2001 Ms. Olympia)
  (2003 Ms. Olympia)
  (2004 Ms. International)
  (13 April 2004)
  (2005 Ms. Olympia)
  (2007 Ms. International)
  (11 September 2008)
  (17 September 2009)
  (2009 Ms. Olympia)
  (2009 Ms. Olympia)
  (2014 Ms. Olympia)
  (2020 Ms. Olympia)
 Quads - 
 Thighs - 
 Waist -

Other interests

Media appearances
On September 9, 2008, Iris made an appearance on episode 9, "The Special Episode", of season 1 of Wipeout. During the episode, she suffered an accident on a water slide in which several of her ribs were broken. She was also constantly referred to as "he" by one of the show's hosts. On September 16, 2008, her appearance was featured as one of the top 25 moments of the show. In an interview with RX Muscle Girls Inc. (with hosts Colette Nelson and Krissy Chin), she revealed that she was invited back for another appearance on Wipeout due to the popularity of her episode but declined, citing the possibility of another injury and the lack of respect she received from the hosts.

Iris appeared in the trailer for the unfinished film A:B - We are Sisyphos and was supposed to play the character "Dina" in the film. She appeared in the 2013 bodybuilding documentary ASF25 – A Documentary. She and her boyfriend, Hidetada Yamagishi, appeared as themselves in the 2017 bodybuilding documentary film Generation Iron 2. She also appeared in the 2017 music video by Katy Perry titled Katy Perry Feat. Nicki Minaj: Swish Swish.

Footage of her was used in the following television episodes: Bodybuilders (On the Inside), Gender Benders (Taboo), and Episode 160 (Real Sports with Bryant Gumbel), along with footage of her appearing in the documentaries Hooked: Muscle Women and Twisted Sisters.

Business
Since July 1998, Iris has been an advanced personal trainer who runs her own online training and nutritional business, Healthier by Choice. Since September 2011, she has been a promoter of the company Visalus. Since 2013, she has been the co-owner of Bodi Cafe, a premier supplement, nutritional company, and smoothie cafe in the City Athletic Club in Las Vegas, Nevada. She is sponsored by PNP Perfect Nutrition.

Real estate
Iris is a real estate agent with ERA Realty.

Personal life
Iris previously lived in Katy, Texas. She has previously been a resident of Cypress, Texas; Glen Flora, Texas; Fullerton, California; Huntington Beach, California (where she is the co-owner of the "No Mercy" Gym); Henderson, Nevada; Houston, Texas; Las Vegas, Nevada; Tustin, California, and Westminster, California. She is a Baptist and routinely thanks God after winning competitions. She always starts her day off with a prayer and a reading from the Bible. Sunday is her rest day and she attends church at least every other Sunday.

Iris is in a relationship with her training and business partner Hidetada Yamagishi, along with previously dating bodybuilder John J. Sherman. Despite having described her political views as liberal, she voted for fellow bodybuilding icon Arnold Schwarzenegger, a Republican, during his bid for Governor of California. She is fluent in German and Spanish.

See also
Female bodybuilding
List of female professional bodybuilders

References

External links

| colspan = 3 align = center | Ms. Olympia
|-

|-
| width = 30% align = center | Preceded by:Yaxeni Oriquen-Garcia
| width = 40% align = center | Second (2006)
| width = 30% align = center | Succeeded by:Herself
|-
| width = 30% align = center | Preceded by:Herself
| width = 40% align = center | Third (2007)
| width = 30% align = center | Succeeded by:Herself
|-
| width = 30% align = center | Preceded by:Herself
| width = 40% align = center | Fourth (2008)
| width = 30% align = center | Succeeded by:Herself
|-
| width = 30% align = center | Preceded by:Herself
| width = 40% align = center | Fifth (2009)
| width = 30% align = center | Succeeded by:Herself
|-
| width = 30% align = center | Preceded by:Herself
| width = 40% align = center | Sixth (2010)
| width = 30% align = center | Succeeded by:Herself
|-
| width = 30% align = center | Preceded by:Herself
| width = 40% align = center | Seventh (2011)
| width = 30% align = center | Succeeded by:Herself
|-
| width = 30% align = center | Preceded by:Herself
| width = 40% align = center | Eighth (2012)
| width = 30% align = center | Succeeded by:Herself
|-
| width = 30% align = center | Preceded by:Herself
| width = 40% align = center | Ninth (2013)
| width = 30% align = center | Succeeded by:Herself
|-
| width = 30% align = center | Preceded by:Herself
| width = 40% align = center | Tenth (2014)
| width = 30% align = center | Succeeded by:None

| colspan = 3 align = center | Ms. International
|-
| width = 30% align = center | Preceded by:Yaxeni Oriquen-Garcia
| width = 40% align = center | First (2004)
| width = 30% align = center | Succeeded by:Yaxeni Oriquen-Garcia
|-
| width = 30% align = center | Preceded by:Yaxeni Oriquen-Garcia
| width = 40% align = center | Second (2006)
| width = 30% align = center | Succeeded by:Herself
|-
| width = 30% align = center | Preceded by:Herself
| width = 40% align = center | Third (2007)
| width = 30% align = center | Succeeded by:Yaxeni Oriquen-Garcia
|-
| width = 30% align = center | Preceded by:Yaxeni Oriquen-Garcia
| width = 40% align = center | Fourth (2009)
| width = 30% align = center | Succeeded by:Herself
|-
| width = 30% align = center | Preceded by:Herself
| width = 40% align = center | Fifth (2010)
| width = 30% align = center | Succeeded by:Herself
|-
| width = 30% align = center | Preceded by:Herself
| width = 40% align = center | Sixth (2011)
| width = 30% align = center | Succeeded by:Yaxeni Oriquen-Garcia
|-
| width = 30% align = center | Preceded by:Yaxeni Oriquen-Garcia
| width = 40% align = center | Seventh (2013)
| width = 30% align = center | Succeeded by:None

1974 births
Actresses from California
Actresses from Michigan
Actresses from Texas
African-American Christians
African-American female bodybuilders
American female bodybuilders
Alcorn State University alumni
Baptists from Texas
Living people
People from Benton Harbor, Michigan
People from Henderson, Nevada
Sportspeople from Houston
People from Katy, Texas
People from Tustin, California
People from Cypress, Texas
People from Wharton County, Texas
People from Westminster, California
Professional bodybuilders
Sportspeople from Fullerton, California
Sportspeople from Harris County, Texas
Sportspeople from Huntington Beach, California
Sportspeople from Las Vegas
Sportspeople from Long Beach, California
Sportspeople from Orange County, California
Sportspeople from Michigan
Sportspeople from Mississippi
Sportspeople from Nevada
Activists from California
Activists from Texas
Baptists from Michigan
Alcorn State Lady Braves basketball
College women's basketball players in the United States
Basketball players from Michigan
21st-century African-American sportspeople
21st-century African-American women
20th-century African-American sportspeople
20th-century African-American women
Indian American female bodybuilders